Nicolás Kicker was the defending champion but was suspended from tennis due to match-fixing.

Pablo Andújar won the title after defeating Pedro Cachín 6–3, 6–1 in the final.

Seeds

Draw

Finals

Top half

Bottom half

References
Main Draw
Qualifying Draw

Challenger de Buenos Aires - Singles
2018 Singles